The 1971 Invercargill mayoral election was part of the New Zealand local elections held that same year. The polling was conducted using the standard first-past-the-post electoral method. Deputy mayor F. Russell Miller was elected mayor, defeating fellow councillor F. W. Harvey. Harvey was also unsuccessful in retaining his council position.

Results
The following table gives the election results:

References

1971 elections in New Zealand
Mayoral elections in Invercargill
October 1971 events in New Zealand